Rita Corbin (1930–2011) was a Catholic Worker and artist.  Her prints have been used in religious publications, such as the newspaper The Catholic Worker and Commonweal, as well as in publications by peace organizations such as the War Resisters League.
She is known for her painting on the wall of the Catholic Worker farm in Tivoli.

In 2011 Corbin died of injuries from an automobile accident.

Illustrated Books

References

Catholic Workers
Roman Catholic activists
1930 births
2011 deaths
Woodcut designers
20th-century American printmakers